Gran Hermano VIP 1, also known as Gran Hermano VIP: El Desafío, was the first season of the reality television Gran Hermano VIP series which was broadcast in Spain on Telecinco and LaSiete and produced by Endemol. The show lasted 69 days from 22 January 2004 to 30 March 2004. Marlène Mourreau emerged as the winner.

Housemates

Nominations table 

Each week the Housemates are split into two teams for a competition. The winning team of the competition is immune from Nomination and Eviction that Week, and must make their Nominations as a group (the winning team is shown in the yellow boxes). Each person has 3 nomination points to give out, they can split these points between 1, 2 or 3 people.

Notes
 This week Housemates could only Nominate for two points - but how they split those points was up to them (for example they could choose to Nominate two Housemates for one point each, or just one Housemate for both points). 
 Juan was automatically nominated for rule-breaking, but would have been nominated anyway as he had enough nomination points. 
 There was no competition this week - just nominations, with a total of 3 nomination points available to assign in any way they like.

See also
 Main Article about the show

References

2004 Spanish television seasons
Gran Hermano (Spanish TV series) seasons